Flat-for-Sale Scheme is a housing development scheme by Hong Kong Housing Society in 1980s. The flats under the scheme are for sale at a concessionary price.  It is similar to Home Ownership Scheme by Hong Kong Housing Authority.

The first estate was the Clague Garden Estate.

See also
Hong Kong Housing Society

References